Ralph Stanley "Buck" Buxton (June 7, 1911 – January 6, 1988) was a Canadian major league pitcher. He pitched five games for the Philadelphia Athletics in 1938 and 14 games for the New York Yankees in 1949. In between, he pitched for the Oakland Oaks of the Pacific Coast League.

Early life and career
Buxton was born in Weyburn but grew up in Long Beach, California. He attended Long Beach Polytechnic High School. He played a couple of seasons of minor league baseball before making his major league debut in 1938 for the Philadelphia Athletics. 

He appeared in 5 games that season. Buxton pitched for the minor league Oakland Oaks, where he was managed by Casey Stengel. He began to anticipate being drafted into the military before the 1943 season, and he missed the 1944 through 1946 seasons due to his military service. He returned to the major leagues in 1949, pitching 14 times for Stengel's New York Yankees.

References

External links

1911 births
1988 deaths
Atlanta Crackers players
Baseball players from California
Baseball people from Saskatchewan
Canadian emigrants to the United States
Los Angeles Angels (minor league) players
Major League Baseball players from Canada
New York Yankees players
Oakland Oaks (baseball) players
Oklahoma City Indians players
Philadelphia Athletics players
Ponca City Angels players
San Francisco Seals (baseball) players